The 1930–31 Washington Huskies men's basketball team represented the University of Washington for the  NCAA college basketball season. Led by eleventh-year head coach Hec Edmundson, the Huskies were members of the Pacific Coast Conference and played their home games on campus at the UW Pavilion in Seattle, Washington.

Washington met Southern division winner California in the Pacific Coast championship series at Seattle. The Huskies won the first game, lost the second by two, setting up a third and deciding game, which they won by twelve. It was Washington's first PCC title; they had lost the championship series in the previous three seasons.

The National Invitation Tournament (NIT) debuted in 1938, and the NCAA Tournament in 1939.

Postseason results

|-
!colspan=6 style=| Pacific Coast Conference Playoff Series

References

External links
Sports Reference – Washington Huskies: 1930–31 basketball season
Washington Huskies men's basketball media guide (2009–10) – History

Washington Huskies men's basketball seasons
Washington Huskies
Washington
Washington